Lutimaribacter marinistellae is a Gram-negative, non-spore-forming and motile bacterium from the genus of Lutimaribacter which has been isolated from a starfish from Sanya in China.

References

External links
Type strain of Lutimaribacter marinistellae at BacDive -  the Bacterial Diversity Metadatabase

Rhodobacteraceae
Bacteria described in 2016